Alexander Heard may refer to:

 G. Alexander Heard (1917–2009), chancellor of Vanderbilt University, political scientist and presidential adviser
 Alexander S. Heard, editorial director of Outside magazine and author